NCAA March Madness is the branding used for coverage of the NCAA Division I men's basketball tournament that is jointly produced by CBS Sports, the sports division of the CBS television network, and Warner Bros. Discovery Sports, the national sports division of Warner Bros. Discovery (WBD) in the United States. Through the agreement between CBS and WBD, which began with the 2011 tournament, games are televised on CBS, TNT, TBS and truTV. CBS Sports Network has re-aired games from all networks.

Initially, CBS continued to provide coverage during most rounds, with the three WarnerMedia channels covering much of the early rounds up to the Sweet Sixteen. Starting in 2016, the regional finals, Final Four and national championship game began to alternate between CBS and TBS. TBS holds the rights to the final two rounds in even numbered years, with CBS getting the games in odd numbered years.

This joint tournament coverage should be distinguished from CBS's regular-season coverage, which it produces independently through its sports division. , none of WBD's outlets cover regular-season college basketball games. Games broadcast on all four networks use a variation of the longtime CBS College Basketball theme (which has been used since 1993) music composed by Bob Christianson.

Background and coverage breakdown

On April 22, 2010, the National Collegiate Athletic Association (NCAA) reached a 14-year agreement, worth US$10.8 billion, with CBS and the Turner Broadcasting System to receive joint broadcast rights to the Division I men's college basketball tournament. This came after speculation that ESPN would try to obtain the rights to future tournament games. The NCAA took advantage of an opt-out clause in its 1999 deal with CBS (which ran through 2013, even though the NCAA had the option of ending the agreement after the 2010 championship) to announce its intention to sign a new contract with CBS and Turner Sports, a division of WarnerMedia (which later was absorbed into Warner Bros. Discovery who, incidentally, jointly owned The CW with the CBS television network's corporate parent Paramount Global). The new contract came amid serious consideration by the NCAA of expanding the tournament to 68 teams.

The agreement, which runs through 2032 (extended from 2024 in 2016), stipulates that all games are available nationally. All First Four games air on truTV. During the first and second rounds, a featured game in each time "window" is broadcast terrestrially on CBS (15 games), while all other games are shown on TBS (12 games), TNT (12 games) or truTV (nine games). Sweet 16 (regional semifinal) and Elite 8 (regional finals) games are split among CBS and TBS. In 2014 and 2015, Turner channels had exclusive rights to the Final Four (with standard coverage airing on TBS), and CBS broadcast the championship game. Since 2016, rights to the Final Four and championship game alternate between Turner and CBS; the 2016 tournament marked the first time that the national championship game was not broadcast on over-the-air television.

The same number of "windows" are provided to CBS as before, although unlike with the previous schedule where all games in a window started within 10 minutes of each other, resulting in the possibility of multiple close games ending at once, the start times of games are staggered, with action lasting later in the night and fewer simultaneous games than in the previous format. As a result of the new deal, Mega March Madness, a pay-per-view out-of-market sports package covering games in the tournament exclusive to DirecTV, including a first and second round 'quad-box' channel showing all four games on one screen, was discontinued.

March Madness On Demand (now called March Madness Live) remained unchanged, with Turner Interactive taking over management of both that service and NCAA.com at the start of 2011. The contract was expected to be signed after a review by the NCAA Board of Directors. In 2012, the service was changed; only games televised by CBS are available for free. All other games are available to authenticated subscribers to the channels on participating television providers. The 2018 tournament, with TBS televising the national semifinals and final, is the first in which those particular games are subject to authentication restrictions. In 2018, March Madness Live added a new "whiparound" stream during the early rounds known as Fast Break (similar in concept to NFL RedZone and ESPN Buzzer Beater), which features live look-ins, analysis, and highlights of simultaneous games.

The CBS-WarnerMedia coverage formally begins with The Selection Show—in which the teams participating in the tournament are announced, which follows CBS's coverage of the final game on Selection Sunday. During the tournament itself, truTV broadcasts pre-game coverage, Infiniti NCAA Tip-Off, while TBS and TruTV also air the post-game show Inside March Madness. CBS also produces coverage of the Reese's College All-Star Game (held on the afternoon of the Final Four at its venue), and the Division II championship game, which are both aired as part of the March Madness package.

In 2016, CBS extended the selection show to a two-hour format; however, the new special was criticized by viewers for being too padded, while the full bracket was leaked online shortly into the broadcast.  In 2017, the selection show was shortened to a 90-minute format, promising to reveal the bracket in a more timely manner. In 2018, the selection show aired for the first time on TBS, with a studio audience and in a two-hour format, in which the entire field of the tournament would be revealed within the first 10 minutes. However, this involved initially revealing the teams in alphabetical order, and not the bracket proper—a decision which proved unpopular among critics and viewers. The show returned to an hour-long format on CBS the following year, and the 2020 edition was also expected to air on CBS.

On April 16, 2016, the contract was extended to 2032 in an $8.8 billion deal. The current broadcasting arrangements, including alternating broadcasts of the semi-finals and final, will remain in force.

WarnerMedia began the process of dissolving the Turner Broadcasting System in March 2019. The corporate reorganization will not outwardly affect coverage of NCAA March Madness, which remains on the same networks.

The 2020 tournament was cancelled due to the COVID-19 pandemic in the United States. All technicians and utility staff who were expected to work the tournament were still paid, while CBS aired classic Final Four games on the afternoons of March 21, 22, and 29 as replacement programming.

The addition of NHL coverage affected coverage during the 2022 First Four on March 16.  When the game between the Boston Bruins and the Minnesota Wild ran long, neither TBS (due to AEW Dynamite) nor truTV (due to continuing coverage of the Rutgers-Notre Dame First Four game) were available for the start of the Tampa Bay Lightning-Seattle Kraken NHL game.  The start of the hockey game was moved to a fourth channel, HLN.

Team Streams
Additionally, for 2014, truTV and TNT aired special "Teamcast" coverage of the Final Four alongside TBS's conventional coverage, which featured commentators and other guests representing the schools in each game. While the consortium planned to tap local radio announcers from each team for the teamcasts, the majority refused due to commitments in calling the games for their local radio networks. However, Turner Sports' senior vice president of production, Craig Barry, did expect such difficulties, and planned accordingly with the possibility of using talent from outlets associated with the team, general region, or their conference (such as regional networks). The Teamcast feeds returned for the 2015 tournament, now branded as Team Stream powered by Bleacher Report.  For 2016, they were also used on the National Championship game.

As CBS prefers having a singular broadcast feed, the Team Stream feature is not used during any year that CBS holds the rights to the Final Four.

The Team Stream feature was also not used for the 2022 NCAA Final Four and that year's National Championship game as truTV and TNT instead simulcast TBS' respective games.

Other college basketball coverage from Turner Sports
Prior to 2011, Turner Sports' best known association with college basketball perhaps occurred on December 11, 1982, when TBS (with the aid of more than 100 independent network affiliates and stations) broadcast a contest between Virginia and Georgetown (led by Ralph Sampson and Patrick Ewing respectively). The game in question (in which TBS paid approximately US$600,000 for the broadcasting rights) was called by Skip Caray and Abe Lemons.

Beginning in 2012, TruTV also began to air the preseason Coaches vs. Cancer Classic as part of a separate deal between Turner Sports and the National Association of Basketball Coaches.

During the 2021–22 season, TNT broadcast three regular season games, all showcasing HBCU’s. They first aired the inaugural Invesco QQQ Legacy Classic, which featured North Carolina Central meeting Hampton, followed by Howard taking on North Carolina A&T. Both games took place at the Prudential Center in Newark, New Jersey, and were called by Stephanie Ready (herself an HBCU alum from Coppin State), Grant Hill (lead analyst for CBS/Turner’s March Madness coverage, alongside Bill Raftery), and Bleacher Report’s Taylor Rooks, with Entertainment Tonight’s Kevin Frazier (himself an HBCU alum from Morgan State), former WNBA great Renee Montgomery, and NBA TV’s Brendan Haywood working pregame and halftime shows. TNT later showed the inaugural NBA-HBCU Classic between Morgan State and Howard. Unlike the Legacy Classic, the NBA-HBCU Classic was simulcast on NBA TV, TNT, and ESPN2, using NBA TV production, but utilizing announcers from both Turner and ESPN. TNT employed Ready, Isiah Thomas (member of the NBA’s 75th Anniversary Team), Haywood, and Rooks, while ESPN employed Brian Custer (himself an HBCU alum from Hampton), and First Take and NBA Countdown’s Stephen A. Smith (himself an HBCU alum from Winston-Salem State).

International coverage
The same year that the CBS-Turner consortium took over, ESPN International acquired rights to the tournament for broadcast outside of the United States for networks such as TSN in Canada as CBS is available through Canadian providers although Bell Media opted not to air the tournament on its CTV Television Network to invoke simsub rights.

While most of the coverage is simulcast from the main U.S. feeds, coverage of the Final Four and national championship game uses a separate world feed produced by the ESPN College Basketball staff; in 2013, the Final Four broadcasts on ESPN International were called by ESPN's lead commentators Dan Shulman and Dick Vitale (alternatively joined by Brad Nessler for the second semi-final game). After Nessler left ESPN, Sean McDonough became the primary play-by-play host, joined by ESPN college basketball analysts Jay Bilas and Vitale.

TUDN broadcasts the tournament in Mexico; CBS and Turner Sports also feature Spanish play-by-play in the United States via each network's second audio program.

Commentary

CBS and Warner Bros. Discover pool their resources for the tournament. While CBS's Jim Nantz remains the lead voice for the tournament, CBS's analysts are joined by analysts from NBA TV and TNT. TNT’s #2 play-by-play man Brian Anderson, who is also the #1 play-by-play announcer for TBS’ baseball coverage, and the main play-by-play announcer for the Milwaukee Brewers, is provided by WarnerMedia. Former lead TNT NBA voice Marv Albert did the same with Anderson, until he ended his association with CBS. (TNT's #1, #3, and #4 NBA voices, Kevin Harlan, Ian Eagle, and Spero Dedes, are already employed by CBS and thus do not require special arrangement to appear.)

Coverage originates from the CBS Broadcast Center in New York City, and the Warner Bros. Discovery Sports studio in Atlanta, where many of the studio shows for the latter division's coverage of the NBA, MLB, and the NHL emanate from.

CBS's college basketball studio host Greg Gumbel holds hosting duties in the New York studio, while Ernie Johnson and Adam Lefkoe split hosting duties in Atlanta, with Lefkoe hosting the First Four, and Johnson hosting from the First Round on. Until 2021 due to COVID, and again in 2023, Gumbel and Johnson had split hosting duties in New York during the first week of the tournament. Johnson's colleagues on Inside the NBA, Charles Barkley and Kenny “The Jet” Smith, join Gumbel and CBS analyst Clark Kellogg in the studio in New York City, while Johnson is joined by Las Vegas Aces power forward and WBD Sports colleague Candace Parker, CBS's Seth Davis, and legendary Villanova head coach Jay Wright in Atlanta. Lefkoe, along with CBS’s Adam Zucker, and WBD’s Nabil Karim provide game updates from the first round through the Sweet 16.

Graphics

2011–2015
During the first five years of the television deal, all games used Turner Sports graphics, which reflect from Turner Sports’ NBA coverage. Games on CBS simply used the CBS logo on Turner's graphics package, including the Final Four and National Championship Game.

2016–2019
With CBS Sports unveiling a new graphics package at Super Bowl 50 in February 2016, a new graphics package was unveiled. This time, the networks all used CBS’s graphics. Despite this being the first year that the Final Four and National Championship aired on TBS (as part of an every-other-year arrangement), the 2016 CBS graphics are now used for all games, including those on TBS, TNT and truTV. However, the games use a slightly different version of the scoreboard that has the network logo in the middle, and in black, as opposed to the usual white logo on the left. For TBS/TNT/truTV games, the network logo simply replaces the CBS eye logo.

This tournament version of the scoreboard is anchored to the edges of the screen with shadows, which light up in team colors after a made basket, an effect not seen on CBS's graphics anywhere else. NBA on TNT and Major League Baseball on TBS also used this graphic package.

In 2018, CBS and Turner modified their logo for March Madness, by changing it to the logo introduced by the NCAA in 2016. However, despite the logo change, the in-game graphics remained unchanged.

2021–present
Following CBS Sports’ rebranding during the week of Super Bowl LV, as part of CBS' unified branding, CBS and WarnerMedia unveiled a new in-game graphics package for the tournament during the Selection Show. However, despite the graphics change, the logo, which was introduced in 2018, remains unchanged.

The tournament version of this scoreboard uses a similar layout of CBS’s regular season graphics, with the CBS, TBS, TNT and truTV logos on the left side of the score bar, and an extra bar being added to the end displaying what round and which region each game is in (e.g. NCAA West 1st Round).

Theme music
As previously mentioned, all four networks use a variation of the CBS College Basketball Theme during the tournament, arranged by Trevor Rabin, who scores the iconic NBA on TNT theme. CBS had continued to use the arrangement that had been in use since 2004 during its regular season coverage, but switched to the March Madness version during the 2021-22 season. Since 1987, CBS/Turner’s coverage of March Madness always concludes with "One Shining Moment", the current version performed by Luther Vandross.

During all intros and outros into commercial breaks in the 2014 coverage, Spanish coverage Galavision used Fiesta by Chilean Singer Denise Rosenthal, all broadcasters used Shot At The Night by The Killers as the theme/bumper music.

During select intros and into commercial breaks in the 2016 coverage, all broadcasters used "Turn Up" by The Heavy as the bumper music.

For the 2017 tournament, all broadcasts used "Something Just Like This" by American EDM group The Chainsmokers and British group Coldplay, as its bumper music.

For 2018, CBS and Turner used Irish-Rock band U2’s song "American Soul", from their new album Songs of Experience. They also used "Say Amen (Saturday Night)" by American rock band Panic! at The Disco during the Final Four on TBS.

2019 featured the return of The Black Keys to March Madness, with their comeback single Lo/Hi, off their comeback album Let's Rock, being used as the main song for CBS and Turner’s coverage. CBS also used "Hey Look Ma, I Made It" by Panic! at the Disco for the Bracket Preview Show.

2020 was to feature a song on TUDN called "Contigo" by Mirela for March Madness. After 3 years of using alternative/rock artists, CBS and Turner were scheduled to use "Dance Again", by American pop singer Selena Gomez.

2021 continued the planned trend of using electronic dance music, with CBS and Turner using "Big Love" by American DJ duo Louis the Child and American hip hop duo EarthGang. CBS also used This Is Heaven by American pop singer Nick Jonas for the Final Four. TUDN uses United by Love with Natalia Oreiro.

In 2022, TUDN used Indispensable by Lucero as a theme song. CBS and Turner meanwhile, used "Freedom" by Jon Batiste, a jazz and R&B singer from New Orleans (coincidentally, the host city of that year's Final Four) who was the bandleader for CBS' The Late Show with Stephen Colbert at the time.

In 2023, TUDN Uses SloMo by Cuban-Spanish singer Chanel as the official Spanish theme for March Madness. CBS and WBD used Take My Breath by acclaimed Canadian singer The Weeknd

References

External links
 NCAA March Madness Live - Official site
 NCAA Basketball on CBS - Official site
 NCAA March Madness — Turner Sports Media
 NCAA Basketball on TBS - Official site 
 NCAA Basketball on TNT - Official site
 NCAA Basketball on TruTV - Official site 

2011 American television series debuts
CBS Sports
CBS original programming
Turner Sports
English-language television shows
Joint ventures
Simulcasts
TNT (American TV network) original programming
TruTV original programming
Turner Sports
TBS (American TV channel) original programming